Deavertown is an unincorporated community in Morgan County, in the U.S. state of Ohio.

History
Deavertown was laid out in 1815, and named for Levi Deaver, one of the original two brothers that settled the town. In 1840, Levi's daughter Matilda (d. 1858) married the future doctor, Daniel Rusk. A post office called Deavertown was established in 1828, and remained in operation until 1957.

References

Unincorporated communities in Morgan County, Ohio
Unincorporated communities in Ohio
1815 establishments in Ohio
Populated places established in 1815